Revoir un Printemps is a studio album by French hip hop group IAM. It was released on 15 September 2003 through Hostile Records with distribution via EMI. Recording sessions took place at Studios Zgen in Avignon, at Studio La Cosca in Marseille, at Sony Music Studios and at Electric Lady Studios in New York, at Bulgarian National Radio Studio 1, and at Studio Claudia Sound in Aubervilliers. Production was handled by Akhenaton, Al-Khemya, Shurik'n, Imhotep, DJ Khéops and Bruno Coulais. It features guest appearances from Beyoncé, Kayna Samet, Method Man & Redman, Syleena Johnson and Bulgarian Symphony Orchestra.

The album peaked atop of French and Wallionian charts and also peaked at number 2 in Swiss Hitparade. It spawned four charted singles: "Noble Art", "Revoir un printemps", "Nous" and "Stratégie d'un pion". The album was certified Gold by both International Federation of the Phonographic Industry Switzerland and Syndicat National de l'Édition Phonographique.

Track listing

Personnel 

 Philippe "Akhenaton" Fragione – main artist, composer & producer (tracks: 1, 3, 4, 6, 7, 11, 13, 15-19), arranger (track 9)
 Geoffroy "Shurik'n" Mussard – main artist, composer & producer (tracks: 2, 5, 6, 8, 10)
 Éric "Khéops" Mazel – main artist, scratches, composer & producer (track 9), arranger (tracks: 4, 6, 8, 9, 12, 14, 16-19)
 Malek "Freeman" Brahimi – main artist
 Pascal "Imhotep" Perez – main artist, composer & producer (tracks: 12, 14), arranger (track 8)
 Kayna Samet – featured artist (track 2)
 Clifford "Method Man" Smith – featured artist (track 4)
 Reginald "Redman" Noble – featured artist (track 4)
 Syleena Johnson – featured artist (track 11)
 Beyoncé Knowles – featured artist (track 13)
 Michael Robinson – vocals (track 15)
 André Charles "Slim" Pezin – acoustic guitar, electric guitar, steel guitar, dobro, bass
 Raoul Duflot-Verez – piano
 Michel Peyratout – bass
 Patrick Bourgoin – alto saxophone, flute
 Mostafa Benhmad – pipe, violin
 Bernard Camoin – trombone
 Eric Giausserand – trumpet
 Marc Chantereau – percussion
 Bulgarian Symphony Orchestra – orchestra
 Deyan Pavlov – conductor
 Bruno Coulais – orchestrations producer, arranger (tracks: 2, 6, 7, 10-13, 16, 18)
 Philippe Amir – recording, assistant engineering
 Eric Chevet – recording, mixing
 Nabil Ghrib – recording
 Michael Tocci – recording (tracks: 4, 11)
 Maxime Lefèvre – recording
 Didier Lizé – recording
 Chris Gehringer – mastering
 Steef Van De Gevel – assistant engineering
 Haythem "H.Boogie" Bouchuiguir – recording coordinator (track 4)
 Kankre Attak – design, photography
 Tous Des K – design, photography

Charts

Weekly charts

Year-end charts

Certifications and sales

References

External links 
 

2003 albums
IAM (band) albums
Albums recorded at Electric Lady Studios